Cricket World Cup qualification is the process national cricket teams go through to qualify for the Cricket World Cup. The Cricket World Cup is a global event, and qualification is used to reduce the large field of participants from about 100 to 10–14. The qualification process has started as early as almost 7 years before the World Cup.

Qualification up to the 2019 World Cup

From the first World Cup in 1975 up to the 2019 World Cup, the majority of teams taking part qualified automatically. Until the 2015 World Cup this was mostly through having Full Membership of the ICC, and for the 2019 World Cup this was mostly through ranking position in the ICC ODI Championship.

Since the second World Cup in 1979 up to the 2019 World Cup, the teams that qualified automatically have been joined by a small number of others who qualified for the World Cup through the qualification process. The number of teams qualifying for the World Cup changed from event to event. The first qualifying tournament being the ICC Trophy; later the process expanding with pre-qualifying tournaments. Pre-qualifying tournaments were held within the five ICC regional bodies (Africa, Americas, Asia, East Asia-Pacific, Europe), and organized by their respective councils.

For the 2011 World Cup onwards, the past pre-qualifying processes were replaced by the World Cricket League, administered by the ICC; and the ICC Trophy became known as the ICC World Cup Qualifier, and this remained the culmination of the qualification process and became the final stage of the World Cricket League competition. The World Cricket League was a series of international one-day cricket tournaments for national teams without Test status. All Associate members of the ICC were able to qualify for the World Cup.

While 12 teams participated in the 2009 ICC World Cup Qualifier and the top 4 teams qualified for the 2011 Cricket World Cup, at the ICC Chief Executives' Committee meeting in September 2011, the ICC decided on a new qualifying format for the 2015 Cricket World Cup. Two teams from the top tier of the pre-qualifying tournament, the 2011–13 ICC World Cricket League Championship, qualified directly and did not compete in the 2014 Cricket World Cup Qualifier, which decided the remaining two places.

For the 2019 World Cup, the host and the seven highest-ranked sides on the MRF Tyres ICC ODI Team Rankings as on 30 September 2017 qualified directly for the event proper. The four bottom-ranked sides were joined by six teams from the ICC World Cricket League in the 10-team ICC Cricket World Cup Qualifier 2018, and the top two sides completed the 10-team World Cup line-up.

The teams that qualified automatically each time, and the performances of the other teams in the final qualifying tournament, are as follows.

Key:

Qualification from the 2023 World Cup onwards

From the 2023 World Cup onwards, only the host nation(s) will qualify automatically. 32 teams are divided into three leagues—Super League, League 2 and Challenge League—each with different paths to World Cup qualification. The leagues and supplementary qualifier and play-off tournaments also determine promotion and relegation between the leagues from one World Cup cycle to the next.

The fourth World Cricket League competition was used for the initial placement of teams into the leagues for the 2023 World Cup qualifying, and has now been abolished.

See also
World Cricket League

References

qualification
Qualification for cricket competitions